Aurseulles is a commune in the Calvados department and Normandy region of north-western France. It was established on 1 January 2017 by the merger of the former communes of Anctoville, Longraye, Saint-Germain-d'Ectot and Torteval-Quesnay. The commune has its administrative offices in Anctoville.

See also 
Communes of the Calvados department

References 

Communes of Calvados (department)
Populated places established in 2017
2017 establishments in France